Juncus mertensianus is a species of rush known by the common name Mertens' rush or Alaska rush. It is native to much of western North America from Alaska to Saskatchewan to New Mexico, where it grows in wet mountainous areas such as riverbanks and alpine meadows. This is a clumping perennial herb growing from a vertical rhizome. Its smooth, flat stems grow to a maximum height near 40 centimeters. Its few leaves are located at the base and also along the stem. The inflorescence is made up of usually one cluster of many flowers. Each flower has shiny dark brown to black tepals 3 to 4 millimeters long, six stamens with yellowish anthers, and long reddish stigmas, as in image at left. The fruit is a dark, oblong capsule, as in image at right.

External links
Jepson Manual Treatment
Photo gallery

mertensianus
Plants described in 1832
Flora of Western Canada
Flora of the Western United States
Flora of Alaska
Flora without expected TNC conservation status